Atractus fuliginosus, Hallowell's ground snake, is a species of snake in the family Colubridae. The species can be found in Venezuela and Tobago.

References 

Atractus
Reptiles of Venezuela
Reptiles of Trinidad and Tobago
Reptiles described in 1845
Taxa named by Edward Hallowell (herpetologist)